One for the Money is an English children's rhyme.

"One for the Money" may also refer to:
One for the Money (novel), by Janet Evanovich
One for the Money (musical), a 1939 musical with Gene Kelly
One for the Money (play), by Warren Manzi

Film and television 

One for the Money (film), a 2012 adaptation of the novel, starring Katherine Heigl
One for the Money (2002 film), a 2002 television film, starring Lynn Collins
"One for the Money" (The Golden Girls), an episode of The Golden Girls
"One for the Money", an episode of Hawaii Five-O

Music 
One for the Money (album), a 1976 album by The Whispers and its title track
One for the Money, a 1997 album by Sheep on Drugs
One for the Money, a 1987 album by T. G. Sheppard
"One for the Money" (song), the album's title track
"One for the Money", a song by Conway Twitty from the album I Love You More Today, 1969
"One for the Money", a song by Escape the Fate from the album Ungrateful, 2013
"One for the Money", a song by Horace Brown from the album Horace Brown, 1996
"One for the Money", a song by Status Quo from the album Ain't Complaining, 1988
"One's 4 da Money", a song by Shyheim from the album AKA the Rugged Child, 1994